Granite Downs was a  cattle station in arid northern South Australia.

It is now part of the Anangu Pitjantjatjara Yankunytjatjara lands.

Birds
A  part of Granite Downs has been identified by BirdLife International as an Important Bird Area (IBA) because it supports a population of the near threatened chestnut-breasted whiteface at its north-western distribution limit. It also supports populations of the inland dotterel, Bourke's parrot, banded whiteface, black honeyeater, pied honeyeater, cinnamon quail-thrush, chiming wedgebill and thick-billed grasswren.

References

Anangu Pitjantjatjara Yankunytjatjara
Stations (Australian agriculture)